Slip-Up is a 1986 British television film directed by James Cellan Jones and starring Jeremy Kemp, George Costigan and Larry Lamb. the film recounts the unsuccessful attempts of Jack Slipper to extradite the Great Train Robber Ronnie Biggs from Brazil.

It is also known by the alternative title The Great Paper Chase.

Cast
 Jeremy Kemp as Jack Slipper
 George Costigan as Sergeant Jones
 Larry Lamb as Ronald Arthur Biggs
 Nicholas Le Prevost as Mackenzie
 Tony Doyle as Vine
 Fulton Mackay as McColl
 Barry Jackson as Hitchen
 Desmond McNamara as Lovelace
 Gwen Taylor as Charmian Biggs
 Silvina Pereira as Raimunda
 To-Zé Martinho as Garcia
 Michael Aitken as Hinch
 George Sweeney as Brennan
 Valerie Braddell as Anthea
 Philip Jackson as Purgavie
 Jack Watling as Champion
 Armando Cortez as Flat Superintendent
 Suzana Borges as Lucia
 Julian Curry as Edwards
 Denys Hawthorne as Neill
 Simon Cutter as Benckendorff
 Ian Hastings as Steel
 António Salgueiro as Old Prisoner
 John Flanagan as Monk & McCabe
 Danny Webb as Monk & McCabe
 Alastair G. Cumming as 	Australian 
 Adelaide João as Family in Favela
 António Évora as Family in Favela
 Eustácio de Abreu as Desk Sergeant
 Angela Erreira as Phyllis
 Rui Neves as TV Interviewer
 Lídia Franco as Recepcionist
 Rogério Samora as Desk Clerk
 António Anjos as Taxi Driver
 João Sarabando as Anthea's driver
 Ricardo Luís Macedo as ITN Reporter

References

Bibliography
 Michael Singer. Film Directors. Lone Eagle Publishing, 2002.

External links
 

1986 television films
1986 films
British television films
Films directed by James Cellan Jones
1980s English-language films